Sam Hargrave is an American stunt coordinator, stuntman, actor and director. He is best known for his collaborations with the Russo brothers, including being the stunt coordinator for several films in the Marvel Cinematic Universe. The pair also wrote and produced Hargrave's directorial debut, Extraction (2020). Hargrave also served as Second Unit Director for season two of The Mandalorian.

Filmography

Director
Short films
 Reign (2007)
 Seven Layer Dip (2010, co-director)
 Love and Vigilance (2012, co-director)
 Game Changer (2013)
 The Shoot (2019)

Feature films
 Extraction (2020)
 Extraction 2 (2023)

Actor

Stunt coordinator
 Mad Cowgirl (2006)
 Dexter (2006)
 T.K.O. (2007)
 Reign (2007)
 The P.A. (2008)
 The Truth Is Underrated (2008)
 Trust Me (2009)
 Once Fallen (2010)
 Acts of Violence (2010)
 Conan the Barbarian (2011)
 Trespass (2011)
 The Cyclist (2012)
 Jackman (2012)
 Love and Vigilance (2012)
 The Host (2013)
 Game Changer (2013)
 The Hunger Games: Catching Fire (2013)
 The Hunger Games: Mockingjay - Part 1 (2014)
 The Hunger Games: Mockingjay - Part 2 (2015)
 Captain America: Civil War (2016)
 The Accountant (2016)
 Suicide Squad (2016)
 Atomic Blonde (2017)
 Wolf Warrior 2 (2017)
 Avengers: Infinity War (2018)
 Deadpool 2 (2018)
 Avengers: Endgame (2019)

References

External links

Living people
Year of birth missing (living people)
American male film actors
American male television actors
American stunt performers